Walter Consuelo Langsam (January 2, 1906 – August 14, 1985) was president of the University of Cincinnati from 1955 to 1971. Langsam was a historian. He wrote 15 books, including "The World Since 1919". He was succeeded by Warren G. Bennis.

Langsam was born January 2, 1906, in New York City. He received his doctoral degree from Columbia University. He was on the faculty of Columbia University beginning in 1927.

While president of the University of Cincinnati, Langsam oversaw its growth from 14,000 students to 35,000 students. The annual budget grew far faster under his guidance, exploding from $10 million a year to $102 million.

References

 

1906 births
1985 deaths
Columbia University alumni
Columbia University faculty
Presidents of the University of Cincinnati
20th-century American historians
20th-century American male writers
American male non-fiction writers
20th-century American academics